Events from the year 1924 in Ireland.

Incumbents
 Governor-General: Tim Healy
 President of the Executive Council: W. T. Cosgrave (CnaG)

Events
15 January – the last internee at Kilmainham Gaol, Ernie O'Malley, is transferred to St. Bricin's Military Hospital.
7–18 March – Irish Army Mutiny over demobilisation within the National Army, led by Liam Tobin's Irish Republican Army Organisation. The outcome affirms subservience of the military to the civilian government.
20 April – Sinn Féin commemorates the anniversary of the events of the 1916 Easter Rising.
24 April – no agreement is reached at the Boundary Conference in London. The Irish Boundary Commission is now set up to examine the border between the Irish Free State and Northern Ireland.
5 May – Dublin Corporation officially renames Sackville Street to O'Connell Street.

6 May – James Craig refuses to nominate a Northern Ireland representative to the Boundary Commission.
30 May – a new licensing Bill is introduced by the Minister for Justice, Kevin O'Higgins. Bars are allowed open between 9am and 10pm and the sale of alcohol is limited to those over the age of 18.
5 June – in an austerity budget, the Minister for Finance, the only Northern Ireland Protestant to serve on a Republic of Ireland cabinet, Ernest Blythe brings in the Old Age Pensions Act 1924, which cuts the old age pension by 10%, from 10/= to 9/= (ten shillings then being around £181 in 2014); an action still remembered with bitterness in Ireland .
3 July – the Minister for Education, Eoin MacNeill, announces that the teaching of Irish is to be made compulsory in all schools.
2–18 August – Tailteann Games are held in Dublin.
18 August – Ireland's first rodeo opens at Croke Park.
1 October – Defence Forces established, incorporating the National Army.
24 October – Éamon de Valera is arrested at Newry Town Hall after defying an order preventing him from speaking in Northern Ireland.
7 November – the President of the Executive Council, W. T. Cosgrave, announces an amnesty for criminal acts committed during the Civil War in connection with the attempt to overthrow the lawfully established government.
19 November – Cardinal Michael Logue, Archbishop of Armagh and Primate of All Ireland, dies, having held office since 1887, and is succeeded by Patrick O'Donnell.

Arts and literature

3 March – Seán O'Casey's drama Juno and the Paycock opens at the Abbey Theatre, Dublin.
May – in the Art competitions at the 1924 Summer Olympics in Paris, Jack Butler Yeats wins a silver medal for painting for Swimming (The Liffey Swim).
Daniel Corkery publishes the study of 18th century Irish poetry The Hidden Ireland.
George Moore publishes the novel Peronnik the Fool.
Liam O'Flaherty publishes his short story collection Spring Sowing.
W. B. Yeats publishes the drama The Cat and the Moon, and Certain Poems.
Eileen Gray begins work with Jean Badovici on their vacation home E-1027 at Roquebrune-Cap-Martin in the south of France.
Mainie Jellett and Evie Hone stage an exhibition of their abstract art in Dublin.

Sport

Football

League of Ireland
Winners: Bohemians
FAI Cup
Winners: Athlone Town 1–0 Fordsons (played on 17 March at Dalymount Park, Dublin)

Gaelic Games
The All-Ireland Champions are Dublin (hurling) and Kerry (Gaelic football)

Births
14 January – Francis Gerard Brooks, Bishop of Dromore (1976–1979; died 2010).
25 January – Tomás Mac Giolla, TD and leader of the Workers' Party (died 2010).
28 January – Sonny Hool, cricketer (died 1988).
8 March – Sean McClory, actor (died 2003).
13 March – Myrtle Allen, chef (died 2018).
26 May – Sheelagh Murnaghan, only Ulster Liberal Party Member of Parliament at Stormont (died 1993).
30 May – Tom Leonard, Fianna Fáil TD (died 2004).
26 June – Dermot Ryan, Roman Catholic Archbishop of Dublin (died 1985).
14 July – Mick Kennefick, Cork hurler (died 1982).
3 August – Jim Gibbons, Fianna Fáil TD, Member of the European Parliament and Cabinet Minister (died 1997).
21 August – David Marcus, writer (died 2009).
7 September – Donal Creed, Fine Gael TD and MEP (died 2017).
5 October – Kieron Moore, actor (died 2007).
21 December – Christy O'Connor Snr, golfer (died 2016).
Approximate date – George Redmond, Assistant City and County Manager in Dublin, accused of corruption (died 2016).

Deaths
29 March – Charles Villiers Stanford, composer (born 1852).
18 May – James Bernard, 4th Earl of Bandon, Deputy Lieutenant in Ireland (born 1850).
26 May – Victor Herbert, composer, cellist and conductor (born 1859).
5 June – William Hare, 3rd Earl of Listowel, peer and Liberal politician (born 1833).
6 June – William Pirrie, 1st Viscount Pirrie, shipbuilder and businessman (born 1847 in Canada; died at sea).
20 June – James Nowlan, President of the Gaelic Athletic Association (1901–1921) (born 1855).
12 December – William Carrigan, Canon of the Diocese of Ossory and historian (born 1860).
Full date unknown – Anne Marjorie Robinson, miniature painter (born 1858).

References

 
1920s in Ireland
Ireland
Years of the 20th century in Ireland